Azzedine Saïd (born 20 May 1961) is an Algerian boxer. He competed at the 1984 Summer Olympics and the 1988 Summer Olympics.

References

External links
 

1961 births
Living people
Algerian male boxers
Olympic boxers of Algeria
Boxers at the 1984 Summer Olympics
Boxers at the 1988 Summer Olympics
Place of birth missing (living people)
Competitors at the 1983 Mediterranean Games
Competitors at the 1987 Mediterranean Games
Mediterranean Games bronze medalists for Algeria
Mediterranean Games silver medalists for Algeria
Mediterranean Games medalists in boxing
Featherweight boxers
21st-century Algerian people
20th-century Algerian people